Brimus randalli is a species of beetle in the family Cerambycidae. It was described by William Lucas Distant in 1898. It is known from the South African Republic.

References

Phrissomini
Beetles described in 1898